Asakyiri is one of the major eight major Akan clans. These clans are derived along the matrilineal lines.

Totem
The totem of the Asakyiri people is the vulture

Origin
It is claimed that the Asona and Asakyiri clans are brothers and sisters used to be referred to as ''Asona ne Asakyiri in Twi meaning Asona and Asakyiri.

Major towns
The major towns of the Asakyiri people are mainly the Adansi regions in the Ashanti Region and this include Akrokerri etc

References

Akan people